Howard Kendall (22 May 1946 – 17 October 2015) was an English footballer and manager.

Kendall joined Preston North End as an apprentice and stayed with the club when he turned professional. He was a runner-up in the 1964 FA Cup with Preston, and at 17 years 345 days was the youngest player to play in a Wembley final. In 1967 he joined Everton, where he played in midfield with Alan Ball and Colin Harvey, the trio gaining the nickname "The Holy Trinity". With Everton, Kendall won the First Division title, the Charity Shield, and was again an FA Cup runner-up. He became Everton captain for three years before being sold to Birmingham City in 1974. Kendall joined Stoke City in 1977, where he became a player-coach and helped the club achieve promotion from the Second Division.

Kendall's managerial career began as a player-manager with Blackburn Rovers in 1979. He returned to Everton in 1981, again as a player-manager, but retired from playing after four games. With Everton he won two Football League titles, an FA Cup, three Charity Shields, and the 1985 European Cup Winners' Cup, as well as a league runners-up place and reached two further FA Cup finals and a League Cup final. Frustrated by the ban from UEFA competitions imposed on English clubs, Kendall left to manage Spanish club Athletic Bilbao in 1987. He was sacked in 1989, but quickly returned to management with Manchester City. After less than a year in Manchester he rejoined Everton but, after three middling seasons he resigned and spent a short time managing Greek side Xanthi. After a few months spent as manager of Notts County, Kendall joined Sheffield United, saving the club from relegation and then taking them to the 1997 play-off final. He returned to Everton for the third time as manager in August 1997, but left the club by mutual consent having only managed to avoid relegation on the final day of the season. His final managerial position was a four-month spell back in Greece, where he took charge of Ethnikos Piraeus and was sacked with the team at the bottom of the table. A member of the League Managers Association's "Hall of Fame", the English Football Hall of Fame, and listed as an "Everton Giant", Kendall remains the last English manager to win a UEFA competition with an English club.

Playing career
Born in Ryton, County Durham, Kendall joined Preston North End as an apprentice in 1961. He turned professional in May 1963 and played in the 1964 FA Cup Final against West Ham United. At the time he was the youngest player to appear in a Wembley final, his place in the side coming due to the regular left-half Ian Davidson being suspended by the club for an unauthorised trip to Scotland. He was aged 17 years 345 days and was the youngest finalist since James Prinsep played for Clapham Rovers in the 1879 final aged 17 years 245 days. Preston lost the final in the last minute.

Originally a defender, Kendall was wanted by Bill Shankly at Liverpool but with Liverpool failing to provide the funds, he ended up joining Everton for £85,000 in March 1967 where he was moved into midfield with Alan Ball and Colin Harvey, the trio gaining the nickname "The Holy Trinity". They were a major component of the Everton team that reached the 1968 FA Cup Final, with Kendall again ending up on the losing side, and they went on to win the First Division title in the 1969–70 season. In the next three seasons, Kendall captained Everton as the side struggled to build on winning the league with a 17th-place finish in 1972–73. He was sold to Birmingham City in February 1974 and he spent four seasons at St Andrew's helping Birmingham survive in the First Division and reach the FA Cup semi-final in 1975.

Kendall joined Stoke City in August 1977 for a fee of £40,000. Stoke under the management of George Eastham had the task of regaining their place in the top flight following relegation. However poor results in early part of the 1977–78 season saw Eastham sacked and replaced by Alan Durban in February 1978. One of the first things Durban did was appoint Kendall as player-coach and he thrived in the role and his performances earned him the club's inaugural player of the year award. Durban built the team around Kendall for the 1978–79 season as Stoke finished in third-place gaining promotion back to the First Division. However, despite Durban wanting Kendall to play for him in the First Division, Kendall decided to join Third Division Blackburn Rovers as player-manager.

Kendall never played for England at senior level despite being included in several squads, but won caps at Schoolboy, Youth and Under-23 level, captaining the England Youth side to victory in the 1964 Little World Cup Final.

Managerial career
In June 1979 Kendall was assigned as player-manager at Blackburn Rovers, helping them win promotion back up to the Second Division in the 1979–80 season and narrowly missing out on promotion to the top tier in 1981 on goal difference.

First spell at Everton
In May 1981 Kendall returned to Everton as player-manager, in the hope of restoring the club to its former glory, although he only played four games before finally retiring as a player in December 1981. On his return to Goodison Park as manager, he made seven signings, including goalkeeper Neville Southall from Bury – who would go on to spend 17 years at the club and play a major part in five major trophy successes. Over the next two seasons, he made further signings - including winger Trevor Steven and midfielder Peter Reid. Everton finished eighth in Kendall's first season as manager and improved to seventh a year later, but began the 1983–84 season poorly, winning just six of their first 21 league games and standing on the brink of the relegation zone.

Kendall was reportedly on the verge of being sacked, but the second half of the season was a very different story. Helped by the £250,000 signing of Wolves striker Andy Gray in November, Everton's form improved. They reached the League Cup final (losing to Liverpool in a replay) and went on to win the FA Cup (beating Watford 2–0) at the end of the season.	
In the 1984–85 season, Everton won the League Championship, finishing 13 points clear of runners-up Liverpool, and the European Cup-Winners' Cup, defeating Austrian side Rapid Vienna, and reached the final of the FA Cup again. Everton narrowly failed to win both the League and the FA Cup in 1985–86 – runners-up in both to Liverpool – but in 1986–87 won the League again, nine points clear of their local rivals, as the Merseyside clubs continued their stranglehold on the English game.

During his first spell at Goodison Park, he built an almost entirely new team which proved itself as one of the finest of the whole decade. He brought in younger players such as Peter Reid and Trevor Steven from smaller clubs to give them the opportunity to prove that they could compete at the highest level, and was largely successful. He also brought in established star players such as Andy Gray, who was instrumental in a season and a half after joining them in late 1983, his goals transforming a struggling side into FA Cup winners and then league champions and European Cup Winners' Cup winners. He then sold Gray to Aston Villa and brought in Gary Lineker who scored 38 goals in the 1985–86 season, albeit narrowly failing to win the major trophies. Everton had toppled Manchester United as league leaders in early February before being overhauled by Liverpool during the final stages of the season, surrendering the title to their local rivals on the final weekend of the season. They were then beaten 3-1 in an all Merseyside FA Cup final.

Kendall left Everton in the summer of 1987, frustrated by the ban from Europe of English clubs, to manage Athletic Bilbao in Spain. As well as the missed opportunity of more European success with Everton, the ban on English clubs in European competitions was a major factor in some of England's leading players moving overseas during this time – including Gary Lineker, who signed for Barcelona after just one season at Goodison Park. The ban on English clubs twice resulted in Everton missing out on competing in the European Cup.

Athletic Bilbao and Manchester City
Kendall's time in Bilbao was not a great success, hindered by limitations on the players he could sign for the Basque club, though his popularity with the supporters was boosted by his assurances that he would not seek to change their traditions. He did manage to lead Athletic to fourth place in La Liga in his first season, and qualification for the following season's UEFA Cup, with eventual elimination by Juventus. He turned down an offer to manage Newcastle United in November 1988 in order to remain in Spain, but was sacked on 15 November 1989 after a poor run of results, and speculation began immediately about where his next job would be. There were frequent reports that he would be the next England manager when Bobby Robson eventually departed. On 7 December 1989, he returned to England as manager of Manchester City and secured their survival with a comfortable 14th-place finish. Kendall's name had also been linked to Manchester United, whose disappointing form that season was leading to media talk – as well as calls from fans – for manager Alex Ferguson to be sacked. In the event, Ferguson kept his job and went on to guide United to numerous trophies until his retirement 23 years later.

With the announcement in late May that Bobby Robson would step down as England manager after the 1990 FIFA World Cup, Kendall's name was inevitably mentioned by the press as a likely successor. However, he quickly dismissed the speculation and declined an offer by The Football Association to be interviewed for the role, which ultimately went to Graham Taylor. Kendall was suggested again as a possible choice for the England job after Taylor resigned in November 1993, but Terry Venables was appointed.

Return to Everton
He returned to Everton for a second spell as manager on 7 November 1990 following the sacking of Colin Harvey, who was re-appointed to the club as his assistant. This was despite the fact he had built a strong Manchester City side that was near the top of the First Division table, and had only just held their cross-city rivals Manchester United to a thrilling 3–3 draw at Maine Road. He famously justified the move by saying that Manchester City was just an affair, but Everton was his marriage. By this stage Everton were battling against relegation to the Second Division, but he turned their season around and they managed to finish ninth and also reach the FA Cup quarter-finals, defeating Liverpool in the fifth round.

In August 1991, he signed 30-year-old striker Peter Beardsley from Liverpool for £1million, in what proved to be a successful transfer as the ageing striker excelled at Goodison Park, scoring 32 goals in two seasons before signing for Newcastle United. Three months later he added another new striker to the revamped Everton attack, when he paid £1.5million for Rangers striker Mo Johnston, but this signing was less successful, and the player was given a free transfer two years later after failing to attract buyers when he was put on the transfer list.

Everton could only manage mid-table league finishes in 1992 and 1993, and Kendall finally resigned on 4 December 1993 after a dismal run of form in the league, and following a dispute with the board of directors, who had blocked his attempt to sign Manchester United striker Dion Dublin.

Later years
After leaving Everton for the second time, Kendall took charge of Greek club Xanthi for a short and largely unsuccessful period. In January 1995, Kendall returned to English football, taking over at First Division Notts County who were struggling badly after a nightmare start to the season, but under Kendall's leadership there was an improvement, with County winning their first two games under his tenure. However, a series of rows with chairman Derek Pavis led to Kendall being sacked in April 1995 – their poor form continued after his departure and the team were relegated to Division Two at the end of the season. Subsequently, Kendall joined Sheffield United in December 1995, saving the club from relegation and then taking them to the 1997 play-off final, which was lost to Crystal Palace. Kendall then returned to Everton for third time as manager in August 1997, but left the club by mutual consent at the end of the season having only managed to avoid relegation on the final day of the season. His third spell was beset by turmoil within the club, working for then chairman, Peter Johnson.

Kendall moved to Greek side Ethnikos Piraeus, but was sacked in March 1999 after only four months in charge and with the club eight points adrift at the bottom of the Greek First Division. It was Kendall's last role in football management, although in 2001 he revealed that he had "had offers" from a number of English clubs which he rejected, and he expressed interest in the Republic of Ireland managers' job, which was eventually given to Giovanni Trapattoni. He remains the last English manager to win a European competition with an English club. Kendall was inducted into the English Football Hall of Fame in 2005 in recognition of his contribution as a manager to the English game.

Death
Kendall died on 17 October 2015 of a heart attack at the Southport and Formby District General Hospital at the age of 69.

Career statistics

As a player
Source:

A.  The "Other" column constitutes appearances and goals in the Anglo-Scottish Cup, European Cup, FA Charity Shield and Texaco Cup.

As a manager

Honours

Player
Preston North End
FA Cup runner-up: 1963–64

Everton
Football League First Division: 1969–70
FA Charity Shield: 1970
FA Cup runner-up: 1967–68

Stoke City
Football League Second Division third-place promotion: 1978–79

Individual
Stoke City Player of the Year: 1977–78

Manager
Blackburn Rovers
Football League Third Division runner-up: 1979–80

Everton
Football League First Division: 1984–85, 1986–87
FA Cup: 1983–84
FA Charity Shield: 1984, 1985, 1986 (shared)
European Cup Winners' Cup: 1984–85

Notts County
Anglo-Italian Cup: 1994–95

Individual
English Manager of the Year: 1984–85, 1986–87
Premier League Manager of the Month: January 1998

See also 
 List of English football championship winning managers

References

External links
 English football Hall of Fame 2005 inductees
 
 
 Athletic Bilbao manager profile

1946 births
2015 deaths
Athletic Bilbao managers
Birmingham City F.C. players
Blackburn Rovers F.C. managers
Blackburn Rovers F.C. players
English football managers
English footballers
England under-23 international footballers
Everton F.C. managers
Everton F.C. players
English expatriate football managers
English expatriate sportspeople in Spain
Expatriate football managers in Greece
Expatriate football managers in Spain
La Liga managers
Manchester City F.C. managers
Notts County F.C. managers
Premier League managers
Preston North End F.C. players
Sheffield United F.C. managers
Stoke City F.C. players
English Football League players
English Football Hall of Fame inductees
People from Ryton, Tyne and Wear
Footballers from Tyne and Wear
Xanthi F.C. managers
Ethnikos Piraeus F.C. managers
English Football League representative players
Association football midfielders
Footballers from County Durham
FA Cup Final players